The men's long jump event at the 1959 Summer Universiade was held at the Stadio Comunale di Torino in Turin with the final on 5 and 6 September 1959.

Medalists

Results

Qualification
Qualification mark: 6.80 metres

Final

References

Athletics at the 1959 Summer Universiade
1959